Marissa Ann Mayer (born May 30, 1975) is an American businesswoman and investor. She is an information technology executive, and co-founder of Sunshine Contacts. Mayer formerly served as the president and chief executive officer of Yahoo!, a position she held beginning in July 2012. It was announced in January 2017 that she would step down from the company's board upon the sale of Yahoo!'s operating business to Verizon Communications for $4.8 billion. She did not join the newly combined company, now called Yahoo Inc. (formerly Verizon Media and prior to that Oath), and she announced her resignation on June 13, 2017.  She was a long-time executive, usability leader and key spokeswoman for Google (employee No. 20).

Early life
Mayer was born in Wausau, Wisconsin, the daughter of Margaret Mayer, an art teacher of Finnish descent, and Michael Mayer, an environmental engineer who worked for water companies. Her grandfather, Clem Mayer, had polio when he was 7 and served as mayor of Jackson, Wisconsin, for 32 years. She has a younger brother. She would later describe herself as having been "painfully shy" as a child and teenager. She "never had fewer than one after-school activity per day," participating in ballet, ice-skating, piano, swimming, debate, and Brownies. During middle school and high school, she took piano and ballet lessons, the latter of which taught her "criticism and discipline, poise, and confidence". At an early age, she showed an interest in math and science.

Education

Wausau West High School 
When she was attending Wausau West High School, Mayer was on the curling team and the precision dance team. She excelled in chemistry, calculus, biology, and physics. She took part in extracurricular activities, becoming president of her high school's Spanish club, treasurer of the Key Club, captain of the debate team, and captain of the pom-pom squad. Her high school debate team won the Wisconsin state championship and the pom-pom squad was the state runner-up. During high school, she worked as a grocery clerk. After graduating from high school in 1993, Mayer was selected by Tommy Thompson, then the Governor of Wisconsin, as one of the state's two delegates to attend the National Youth Science Camp in West Virginia.

Stanford University 
Intending to become a pediatric neurosurgeon, Mayer took pre-med classes at Stanford University. She later switched her major from pediatric neuroscience to symbolic systems, a major which combined philosophy, cognitive psychology, linguistics, and computer science. At Stanford, she danced in the university ballet's Nutcracker, was a member of parliamentary debate, volunteered at children's hospitals, and helped bring computer science education to Bermuda's schools.

During her junior year, she taught a class in symbolic systems, with Eric S. Roberts as her supervisor. The class was so well received by students that Roberts asked Mayer to teach another class over the summer. Mayer went on to graduate with honors from Stanford with a BS in symbolic systems in 1997 and an MS in computer science in 1999. For both degrees, her specialization was in artificial intelligence. For her undergraduate thesis, she built travel-recommendation software that advised users in natural-sounding human language.

Illinois Institute of Technology 
In 2009, the Illinois Institute of Technology granted Mayer an honoris causa doctorate degree in recognition of her work in the field of search.

Mayer interned at SRI International in Menlo Park, California, and Ubilab, UBS's research lab based in Zurich, Switzerland. She holds several patents in artificial intelligence and interface design.

Career

Google (1999–2012) 

After graduating from Stanford, Mayer received 14 job offers, including a teaching job at Carnegie Mellon University and a consulting job at McKinsey & Company. She joined Google in 1999 as employee number 20. She started out writing code and overseeing small teams of engineers, developing and designing Google's search offerings. She became known for her attention to detail, which helped land her a promotion to product manager, and later she became director of consumer web products. She oversaw the layout of Google's well-known, unadorned search homepage. She was also on the three-person team responsible for Google AdWords, which is an advertising platform that allows businesses to show their product to relevant potential customers based on their search terms. AdWords helped deliver 96% of the company's revenue in the first quarter of 2011.

In 2002, Mayer started the Associate Product Manager (APM) program, a Google mentorship initiative to recruit new talents and cultivate them for leadership roles. Each year, Mayer selected a number of junior employees for the two-year program, where they took on extracurricular assignments and intensive evening classes. Notable graduates of the program include Bret Taylor and Justin Rosenstein. In 2005, Mayer became Vice President of Search Products and User Experience. Mayer held key roles in Google Search, Google Images, Google News, Google Maps, Google Books, Google Product Search, Google Toolbar, iGoogle, and Gmail.

Mayer was the vice president of Google Search Products and User Experience until the end of 2010, when she was asked by then-CEO Eric Schmidt to head the Local, Maps, and Location Services. In 2011, she secured Google's acquisition of survey site Zagat for $125 million. While Mayer was working at Google, she taught introductory computer programming at Stanford and mentored students at the East Palo Alto Charter School. She was awarded the Centennial Teaching Award and the Forsythe Award from Stanford.

Yahoo! (2012–2017)

On July 16, 2012, Mayer was appointed president and CEO of Yahoo!, effective the following day. She was also a member of the company's board of directors. At the time of her appointment, Yahoo's numbers had been falling behind those of Google for over a year and the company had been through several top management changes. To simplify the bureaucratic process and "make the culture the best version of itself", Mayer launched a new online program called PB&J. It collects employee complaints, as well as their votes on problems in the office; if a problem generates at least 50 votes, online management automatically investigates the matter. In February 2013, Mayer oversaw a major personnel policy change at Yahoo! that required all remote-working employees to convert to in-office roles. Having worked from home toward the end of her pregnancy, Mayer returned to work after giving birth to a boy, and built a mother's room next to her office suite—Mayer was consequently criticized for the ban on remote work. In April 2013, Mayer changed Yahoo!'s maternity leave policy, lengthening its time allowance and providing a cash bonus to parents. CNN noted this was in line with other Silicon Valley companies, such as Facebook and Google. Mayer has been criticized for many of her management decisions in pieces by The New York Times and The New Yorker.

On May 20, 2013, Mayer led Yahoo! to acquire Tumblr in a $1.1 billion acquisition. In February 2016, Yahoo! acknowledged that the value of Tumblr had fallen by $230 million since it was acquired. In July 2013, Yahoo! reported a fall in revenues, but a rise in profits compared with the same period in the previous year. Reaction on Wall Street was muted, with shares falling 1.7%. In September 2013, it was reported that the stock price of Yahoo! had doubled over the 14 months since Mayer's appointment. However, much of this growth may be attributed to Yahoo!'s stake in the Chinese e-commerce company Alibaba Group, which was acquired before Mayer's tenure.

In November 2013, Mayer instituted a performance review system based on a bell curve ranking of employees, suggesting that managers rank their employees on a bell curve, with those at the low end being fired. Employees complained that some managers were viewing the process as mandatory. In February 2016, a former Yahoo! employee filed a lawsuit against the company claiming that Yahoo's firing practices have violated both California and federal labor laws.

In 2014, Mayer was ranked sixth on Fortunes 40 under 40 list, and was ranked the 16th most-powerful businesswoman in the world that year according to the same publication. In March 2016 Fortune named Mayer as one of the world's most disappointing leaders. Yahoo! stocks continued to fall by more than 30% throughout 2015, while 12 key executives left the company.

In December 2015, the New York-based hedge fund SpringOwl, a shareholder in Yahoo Inc., released a statement arguing that Mayer be replaced as CEO. Starboard Value, an activist investing firm that owns a stake in Yahoo, likewise wrote a scathing letter regarding Mayer's performance at Yahoo. By January 2016, it was further estimated that Yahoo!'s core business has been worth less than zero dollars for the past few quarters. In February 2016, Mayer confirmed that Yahoo! was considering the possibility of selling its core business. In March 2017, it was reported that Mayer could receive a $23 million termination package upon the sale of Yahoo! to Verizon.

Mayer announced her resignation on June 13, 2017. In spite of large losses in advertising revenue at Yahoo! and a 50% reduction in staff during her 5 years as CEO, Mayer was paid a total of $239 million over that time, mainly in stock and stock options. On the day of her resignation, Mayer publicly highlighted many of the company's achievements during her tenure, including: creating $43B in market capitalization, tripling Yahoo stock, growing mobile users to over 650 million, building a $1.5B mobile ad business, and transforming Yahoo's culture. Over Mayer's tenure, the number of monthly visits on Yahoo's home page dropped from nearly 10 billion to less than 4.5 while Google's increased from 17 billion to over 56.

On November 8, 2017, along with several other present and former corporate CEOs, Mayer testified before the United States Senate Committee on Commerce, Science, and Transportation regarding major security breaches at Yahoo during 2013 and 2014.

Allegations of gender-based discrimination
Scott Ard, a prominent editorial director, fired from Yahoo! in 2015, filed a lawsuit alleging that "Mayer encouraged and fostered the use of an employee performance-rating system to accommodate management’s subjective biases and personal opinions, to the detriment of Yahoo!’s male employees." He claimed that, prior to his firing, he had received "fully satisfactory" performance reviews since starting at the company in 2011 as head of editorial programming for Yahoo!'s home page; however, he was relieved of his role, which was given to a woman who had been recently hired. This case was dismissed in March 2018.

An earlier lawsuit was filed by Gregory Anderson, who was fired in 2014, alleging the company’s performance management system was arbitrary and unfair and disguised layoffs as terminations for the purpose of evading state and federal WARN Acts, making it the first WARN Act and gender discrimination lawsuit Yahoo! and Mayer faced in 2016.

Sunshine (2018–present)
After leaving Yahoo! in 2017, Mayer started Lumi Labs with former colleague Enrique Munoz Torres. The company is based in Palo Alto and is focused on artificial intelligence and consumer media. On November 18, 2020, Mayer announced that Lumi Labs would be rebranded as Sunshine at the same time as she announced its first product: Sunshine Contacts. Sunshine Contacts claims to improve users' iPhone contacts and Google contacts using intelligent algorithms, contact data, public sources, and more.

Boards
As well as sitting on the boards of directors of Walmart, Maisonette, and Jawbone, Mayer also previously served or sits on several non-profit boards, such as Cooper–Hewitt, National Design Museum, New York City Ballet, San Francisco Ballet, and San Francisco Museum of Modern Art.

Business investments
Mayer actively invests in technology companies, including crowd-sourced design retailer Minted, live video platform Airtime.com, wireless power startup uBeam, online DIY community and e-commerce company Brit + Co., mobile payments processor Square, home décor site One Kings Lane, genetic testing company Natera, and nootropics and biohacking company Nootrobox.

Accolades
Mayer was named to Fortune magazine's annual list of America's 50 Most Powerful Women in Business in 2008, 2009, 2010, 2011, 2012, 2013, and 2014 with ranks at 50, 44, 42, 38, 14, 8 and 16 respectively. In 2008, at age 33, she was the youngest woman ever listed.

Mayer was named one of Glamour Magazines Women of the Year in 2009. She was listed in Forbes Magazine's List of The World's 100 Most Powerful Women in 2012, 2013 and 2014, with ranks of 20, 32 and 18 respectively.

In September 2013, Mayer became the first CEO of a Fortune 500 company to be featured in a Vogue magazine spread.

In 2013, she was also named in the Time 100, becoming the first woman listed as number one on Fortune magazine's annual list of the top 40 business stars under 40 years old.
Mayer made Fortune magazine history in 2013, as the only person to feature in all three of its annual lists during the same year: Businessperson of the Year (No. 10), Most Powerful Women (at No. 8), and 40 Under 40 (No. 1) at the same time. In March 2016, Fortune then named Mayer as one of the world's most disappointing leaders.

On December 24, 2015, Mayer was listed by UK-based company Richtopia at number 14 in the list of 500 Most Influential CEOs.

Mayer appeared on the List of women CEOs of Fortune 500 companies in 2017, having ranked 498 of the top 500 Fortune 500 company CEOs.

Personal life
Mayer briefly dated Larry Page in the early 2000s who was the CEO of Google at the time.

Mayer married lawyer and investor Zachary Bogue on December 12, 2009. On the day Yahoo! announced her hiring, Mayer revealed that she was pregnant; she gave birth to a boy on September 30, 2012. Although she asked for baby name suggestions via social media, she eventually chose the name Macallister from an existing list. On December 10, 2015, Mayer announced that she had given birth to identical twin girls, Marielle and Sylvana.

Mayer is Lutheran, but she has said—referencing Vince Lombardi's "Your God, your family and the Green Bay Packers"—that her priorities are "God, family and Yahoo!, except I'm not that religious, so it's really family and Yahoo!."

References

Further reading
 What Happened When Marissa Mayer Tried to Be Steve Jobs (2014-12-17), Nicholas Carlson, The New York Times
 Marissa Mayer – How Yahoo! went from mess to an Apple Design award (2014-08-15), Tim Green, Hot Topics

External links

 
 "Marissa Mayer: One of the Most Powerful Women in Business" at Richtopia

1975 births
21st-century American businesspeople
American chief executives of Fortune 500 companies
American computer businesspeople
American computer programmers
American corporate directors
American investors
American Lutherans
American people of Finnish descent
American people of German descent
American technology chief executives
American women academics
American women chief executives
Businesspeople from Wisconsin
Businesspeople in information technology
Directors of Walmart
Directors of Yahoo!
Google employees
Living people
People from Wausau, Wisconsin
Stanford University alumni
Technology corporate directors
Women corporate directors
American women investors
Yahoo! employees
American women computer scientists
American computer scientists
21st-century American businesswomen
21st-century American women scientists